The 2009 La Flèche Wallonne cycling race  took place on 22 April 2009. It was the 73rd running of the La Flèche Wallonne between Charleroi and Huy in Belgium.

Christophe Moreau and Fumiyuki Beppu took a very early lead, but Moreau eventually dropped Beppu on the second climb up the Mur de Huy and went off by himself. At one point, Moreau had his lead over the peloton up to 15 minutes. He was caught at 24 km to go.

Many riders tried to open a gap before the final climb of the Mur de Huy, but none were successful. On the Mur, David Lelay jumped away from the pack, which was led by Cadel Evans. Only a few hundred meters before the finish did the Australian overtake the Frenchman. Andy Schleck and Davide Rebellin followed Evans for some time, before accelerating out of his wheel. Rebellin proved to accelerate quicker than Schleck, so there was no real fight for the victory.

Rebellin's win is in doubt after his re-tested A sample in 2008 Summer Olympics was positive.

Results

References

External links

2009 UCI World Ranking
2009